KKAG (88.3 FM) is a radio station licensed to serve the community of Grangeville, Idaho. The station is owned by Calvary Chapel of Grangeville, Inc. It airs an oldies format.

The station was assigned the KKAG call letters by the Federal Communications Commission.

References

External links
Official website

KAG (FM)
Oldies radio stations in the United States
Radio stations established in 2011
2011 establishments in Idaho